Black Lake is a Scandinavian thriller television series, devised by Ulf Kvensler and co-produced by TV3 Sverige, TV3 Danmark, TV3 Norge, Viaplay, and Jarowskij, that first broadcast in Sweden and Denmark in October 2016. The first eight-part series, which also alludes to hints of the supernatural and horror genres, is based around a disused ski resort in the north of Sweden, and was written by Kvensler, Moa Herngren, Peter Arrhenius, and Jonathan Sjöberg, and directed by Sjöberg and David Berron. The first series broadcast on BBC Four in the United Kingdom from 16 September to 7 October 2017, with two episodes broadcast back-to-back each week. The first series was later released on Region 2 DVD on 9 October 2017.

A second series was announced in 2017, serving as a prequel to the first. The main characters were Filip Berg, returning from the first series, joined by Hedda Stiernstedt, Daniel Larsson, David Nzinga, Bahar Pars and Alida Morberg. The second series follows Johan (Berg) as he and five other participants take place in a rehabilitation programme on the island of Kallskär. The second series broadcast in Sweden and Denmark from October 2018, followed by a BBC Four broadcast commencing on 29 December 2018. A Region 2 DVD release has been set for 18 March 2019.

Plot

Series 1 (2016)
Johan takes his brother and six friends to the north of Sweden because he is thinking of purchasing a disused ski hotel close to the border with Norway. It never officially opened because a family of four was murdered in the hotel's cellar shortly before it was due to open twenty years earlier. Johan's girlfriend, Hanne, who suffers long-term guilt over the death of her younger brother, quickly comes to believe that the building is possessed by the spirit of a dead child (a myling). At the same time, the surly caretaker, Erkki, is trying to scare them away from the property, with assistance from two Norwegian brothers who run a nearby snowmobile business. Having accepted Johan's marriage proposal, Hanne becomes friendly with Jostein, the younger of the brothers.

Hanne has found a series of child's drawings and these seem to become reality during the stay. Sami words written on paper and walls around the hotel mean "kill or be killed". The group holds a seance where the ghost of a boy named Mikkel seems to be trying to contact them. Jessan, one of the women, gets a red eye, and starts to behave strangely. Hanne speaks to the detective who investigated the first murders. He tells her that he thinks Helgesen, the resort's previous owner, was not convinced he had done the killings despite confessing to the crime. When Jessan tries to kill her boyfriend, Frank, she is subdued and tied up. Hanne discovers from talking to her that Jessan has been having nightmares. Jessan then discovers her bindings have become loose and hides in the toilet. When the police break down the door, she is found dead with a frozen scream on her face.

Osvald, who is secretly dating Johan's brother, gets a red eye and disappears in the cellar. Hanne finds the cellar door open and goes in to investigate, but is attacked and has to flee from the unseen attacker. In the cellar, she finds a secret room that contains medical files, relating to an earlier period when the hotel was a sanatorium. Hanne, her sister Mette, and Frank decide to leave, but Hanne thinks she sees a child in the road, and grabs the steering wheel, causing the vehicle to crash. Lippi is injured in the cellar after finding Osvald's dead body there. Mette, who is a doctor, returns just in time to save Lippi. Meanwhile, Elin, an old flame of Johan's, has a red eye and starts to walk around in a trance. Under the influence of the "kill or be killed" words, she strangles Lippi. When Johan finds her bracelet and realises she has killed his brother, he strangles her to death.

Mette discovers that Erkki wants them gone because he has allowed Dag and Jostein to use part of the cellar for growing cannabis. Johan and Frank confront the brothers, but Dag stabs Johan and slits Frank's throat. When he attempts to kill Hanne, Jostein shoots Dag dead. Hanne walks into the mountains and communes with her dead brother, Jacob. During another seance, Hanne is attacked by something and gets a red eye. All three go to Erkki's house. He eventually admits that he and his half-brother Mikkel lived with their doctor father at the sanatorium. Erkki's mother was a Sami who had a relationship with his father. But because he believed in Aryan superiority he saw Erkki as belonging to an inferior race. After Erkki beat his brother in a fight, his angry father strangled Mikkel for being weak.

After returning to the hotel, Hanne notices that one of the child's drawings shows the bed in the cellar's secret room with a space underneath. Climbing under the floor, she recovers the body of Mikkel. Before they can give the body respectful funeral rites, Erkki stops them. Johan, who now has a red eye, has survived the stabbing; he returns and shoots Erkki. However, outside the cellar Hanne kills Johan when he attempts to kill Jostein. Hanne, Mette and Jostein burn Mikkel's body on a traditional funerary pyre. They then pack their things and leave. However, on the drive back to civilisation, Jostein removes his sunglasses to reveal he now has a red eye.

Cast
 Filip Berg as Johan Cedar; a wealthy Swedish businessman; Hanne's boyfriend (Series 1) and participant of the rehabilitation programme (Series 2)

Series 1 (2016)

 Sarah-Sofie Boussnina as Hanne; a young Danish woman, still haunted by the death of her younger brother in a boating accident many years ago
 Mathilde Norholt as Mette; Hanne's older sister, a doctor
 Philip Oros as Frank; a friend of Johan's
 Aliette Opheim as Jessan; Frank's new girlfriend
 Valter Skarsgård as Lippi Ceder; Johan's younger brother
 Anna Åström as Elin Hubinette; an old flame of Johan's
 Victor von Schirach as Osvald; a friend of Johan's, in a secret relationship with Lippi
 Odin Waage as Jostein; a local Norwegian
 Anderz Eide as Dag; Jostein's older brother
 Nils Ole Oftebro as Erkki; the resort's caretaker
 Henrik Schyffert as Broman; a retired detective living nearby who investigated the Helgesen murders
 Christian Skolmen as Helgesen; the former owner of the resort, who supposedly murdered a family there

Series 2 (2018)

 Hedda Stiernstedt as Minnie Karlsson; a single mother fighting for custody of her daughter
 Daniel Larsson as Oscar Leander; a former participant of the programme, returning to participate for a second year
 David Nzinga as Vincent Manucho; an ex-con recently released from prison following a two-year sentence
 Bahar Pars as Amina Herlitz; a recovering sex addict and adulterer
 Alida Morberg	as Isabelle 'Bella' Berglund; a former employee-turned-participant of the programme
 André Eriksen	as Uno Lejon; leader of the Kallskär rehabilitation programme
 Ester Uddén as Agnes Linder; Uno's assistant and second-in-command
 Anja Landgré as Gittan Manheim; childhood inhabitant of Kallskär
 Valter Skarsgård as Lippi Ceder; Johan's younger brother (brief appearance)
 Anna Åström as Elin Hubinette (brief appearance)

Episodes

Series 1 (2016)

Series 2 (2018)

Reception
Karolina Fjellborg of Aftonbladet wrote that she felt that the characters in the first series were "predictable" and that the series "added nothing to the horror genre", but that she enjoyed Henrik Schyffert's performance and that his casting as the police officer Broman was an "inspired decision". She concluded that the series could "work for younger viewers who might be unaffected by the series' lack of originality".

References

External links
 

Swedish crime television series
Television shows set in Sweden
2016 Swedish television series debuts
Swedish-language television shows